On the corner of Hearst Avenue and Gayley Road, in Berkeley, California, lies the Founders' Rock, the spot, according to college lore, where the 12 trustees of the College of California, the nascent University of California, Berkeley, stood on April 16, 1860, to dedicate the property they had just purchased. This is, supposedly, the same spot where Frederick Billings stood in 1866 when he remembered Bishop Berkeley's verse — "Westward the course of empire takes its way" — and thus inspired the name of the new city. A plaque was put on this spot on Charter Day in 1896.

References

University of California, Berkeley
National Register of Historic Places in Berkeley, California
Natural features on the National Register of Historic Places